Toru-Aygyr, also known as Toraygyr, is a village in Issyk-Kul Region, Kyrgyzstan. It is part of the Issyk-Kul District. Its population was 2,967 in 2021.

References

Populated places in Issyk-Kul Region